The first phase of Line 2 of Wuhu Rail Transit runs between Wanchunhulu station to Jiuziguangchang station, with transfer to Line 1 at Jiuziguangchang station. It opened on 28 December 2021.

Stations

Phase 2 
The second phase of Line 2 is under planning and will be completed by 2025. It will extend Line 2 to Jiangbei railway station.

References

Wuhu Rail Transit lines
Railway lines opened in 2021
2021 establishments in China